Alfonso Araújo Gaviria (28 July 1902 — 4 February 1961) was a Colombian lawyer, diplomat, and Liberal party politician, who served as the 8th Permanent Representative of Colombia to the United Nations, the 3rd Ambassador of Colombia to Brazil, the 21st Minister of Finance and Public Credit, the 15th Minister of National Education, and the 38th Minister of Public Works of Colombia, as well as Minister of Government, and Envoy of Colombia to Venezuela.

Personal life
Alfonso was born on 28 July 1902 in Bogotá, D.C., Colombia to Simón Araújo Vélez and Ifigénia Gaviria Cobaleda. He graduated Juris Doctor from the Externado University in 1923. He married Emma Ortiz Márquez and had four children: Emma, Helena, María Mercedes, and Roberto.

References

1902 births
1961 deaths
People from Bogotá
Colombian people of Galician descent
Colombian Liberal Party politicians
Universidad Externado de Colombia alumni
Ambassadors of Colombia to Brazil
Ambassadors of Colombia to Venezuela
Colombian Ministers of Government
Ministers of Finance and Public Credit of Colombia
Colombian Ministers of National Education
Colombian Ministers of Public Works
Permanent Representatives of Colombia to the United Nations
20th-century Colombian lawyers